Domingos Sávio Asevedo de Sousa, or Sávio Sousa (born 3 March 1977 in Parnaíba, Piauí, Brazil), is football coach and former player. He was a futsal trainer for the Iranian team Shensa Saveh, winning the Iran Super League and the Asian Champions Cup.

Club career
Sávio Sousa joined the Iranian club Shensa Saveh in 2005 and was player-manager for the team.

Managerial career
Sávio Sousa became the coach of Shensa Saveh in 2005 and won the Iranian Super league and Asian champions league in futsal. He became the coach of Shensa Arak in November 2009.

Coaching career statistics

Honurs
With Shensa Saveh:

Iranian Super League (Futsal) champion:
2006-07

AFC Futsal Club Championship Champion:
2006

References

External links
 http://savioasevedosousa.blogspot.com/
 http://www.treinadores.com.br/index.php?option=com_comprofiler&task=userProfile&user=161

Living people
1977 births
Expatriate football managers in Iran
Brazilian footballers
Shensa Saveh FSC players
Association footballers not categorized by position
Brazilian football managers
Sportspeople from Piauí